The XJR-8 was a race car built by Jaguar for campaigning in the World Sportscar Championship and the 24 Hours of Le Mans as part of Group C. It was used during the 1987 season.

History 

In the 1980s racing expert Tom Walkinshaw and designer Tony Southgate, with support from the Jaguar company and a sponsor, Silk Cut,
designed a car based on the Jaguar V12 to compete in the ultra-high performance Le Mans Group C class and the North American-based IMSA GT Championship in competition with Porsche and Mercedes. In all, sixty-four changes to the XJR-6 were made to create the XJR-8.  Six cars were produced(three plus three converted XJR-6s).

Performance 

The XJR-8 was similar to most of the previous XJR racers with one exception, the engine. Its higher-pitched exhaust sound made it distinguishable from the lion-type roar of Porsche. It first appeared at the 1987 World Sportscar Championship. The XJR-8 won at Silverstone, Nürburgring, and Spa-Francorchamps, as well as taking 2nd place at Fuji. Jaguar won both the driver's title and the overall championship (8 total victories in 10 races) with Porsche and its vaunted 962 finishing 2nd.
Three cars were prepared for competition in the international Le Mans, each with a low-drag configuration. Two out of the three cars failed to finish. The surviving car, which was in 2nd place at one point after 18 hours of racing, experienced gearbox trouble and finished 5th.

The XJR-8 raced for one year, that being 1987. In its only year of racing, it won Autosport Racing Car Of the Year. Its design was advanced to produce the XJR-9, which was identical to its predecessor, in the following year. One of the surviving vehicles is on display at the Beaulieu Motor Museum.

References 

XJR-08
Group C cars
IMSA GTP cars